Lim Kwan-Sik  (born 28 July 1975) is a South Korean retired footballer who played as a midfielder. He made his national team debut on 21 January 2000 at friendly against New Zealand.

References

External links 

1975 births
Living people
Association football midfielders
South Korean footballers
Busan IPark players
Jeonnam Dragons players
K League 1 players